Erosion control is the practice of preventing or controlling wind or water erosion in agriculture, land development, coastal areas, river banks and construction. Effective erosion controls handle surface runoff and are important techniques in preventing water pollution, soil loss, wildlife habitat loss and human property loss.

Usage
Erosion controls are used in natural areas, agricultural settings or urban environments. In urban areas erosion controls are often part of stormwater runoff management programs required by local governments. The controls often involve the creation of a physical barrier, such as vegetation or rock, to absorb some of the energy of the wind or water that is causing the erosion. They also involve building and maintaining storm drains. On construction sites they are often implemented in conjunction with sediment controls such as sediment basins and silt fences.

Bank erosion is a natural process: without it, rivers would not meander and change course. However, land management patterns that change the hydrograph and/or vegetation cover can act to increase or decrease channel migration rates. In many places, whether or not the banks are unstable due to human activities, people try to keep a river in a single place. This can be done for environmental reclamation or to prevent a river from changing course into land that is being used by people. One way that this is done is by placing riprap or gabions along the bank.

Examples
Examples of erosion control methods include the following:

cellular confinement systems
crop rotation
conservation tillage
contour bunding
contour plowing
cover crops
fiber rolls (also called straw wattles)
gabions
hydroseeding 
level spreaders
mulching
perennial crops
plasticulture
polyacrylamide (as a coagulant)
reforestation
riparian buffer
riprap
strip farming
sand fence
vegetated waterway (bioswale)
terracing
windbreaks

Mathematical modeling
Since the 1920s and 1930s scientists have been creating mathematical models for understanding the mechanisms of soil erosion and resulting sediment surface runoff, including an early paper by Albert Einstein applying Baer's law. These models have addressed both gully and sheet erosion. Earliest models were a simple set of linked equations which could be employed by manual calculation. By the 1970s the models had expanded to complex computer models addressing nonpoint source pollution with thousands of lines of computer code. The more complex models were able to address nuances in micrometeorology, soil particle size distributions and micro-terrain variation.

See also

Bridge scour
Burned area emergency response
Certified Professional in Erosion and Sediment Control
Coastal management
Dust Bowl
Natural Resources Conservation Service (United States)
Tillage erosion
Universal Soil Loss Equation
Vetiver System

Notes

References

 Albert Einstein. 1926. Die Ursache der Mäanderbildung der Flußläufe und des sogenannten Baerschen Gesetzes, Die Naturwissenschaften, 11, S. 223–224
 C. Michael Hogan, Leda Patmore, Gary Latshaw, Harry Seidman et al. 1973. Computer modeling of pesticide transport in the soil for five instrumented watersheds, U.S. Environmental Protection Agency Southeast Water laboratory, Athens, Ga. by ESL Inc., Sunnyvale, California
 Robert E. Horton. 1933. The Horton Papers
 U.S. Natural Resources Conservation Service (NRCS). Washington, DC.  "National Conservation Practice Standards." National Handbook of Conservation Practices. Accessed 2009-03-28.

External links
"Saving Runaway Farm Land", November 1930, Popular Mechanics One of the first articles on the problem of soil erosion control
Erosion Control Technology Council - a trade organization that mission is to educate and standardize the erosion control industry
International Erosion Control Association - Professional Association, Publications, Training
WatchYourDirt.com - Erosion Control Educational Video Resource
Soil Bioengineering and Biotechnical Slope Stabilization - Erosion Control subsection of a website on Riparian Habitat Restoration

Construction
Soil erosion
Earthworks (engineering)
Riparian zone
Sustainable design
Water pollution